Geoffrey Trevor Marden Holt MBE, DL (born 24 February 1966) is an English sailor from Portsmouth, Hampshire. Paralysed in an accident at the age of eighteen, in 2007 he became the first quadriplegic yachtsman to sail solo around Great Britain.

In September 2007, Holt completed his 1,500 sail around the UK in his 15 ft trimaran dinghy "Freethinker" becoming the first severely disabled person to make the journey. In December 2007 he was named BBC South Sports Personality of the Year.

In 2008, Holt wrote his autobiography "Walking on Water".

In December 2009 he set out to cross the Atlantic Ocean on his yacht the Impossible Dream, aiming to become the first quadriplegic to do so. He succeeded in this 2,700 mile crossing, arriving on 7 January 2010.

Holt was appointed Member of the Order of the British Empire (MBE) in the 2010 Birthday Honours.

Holt also won the title of Yachting Journalist Association (YJA) Pantaenius Yachtsman of the Year for 2010. Of this award, he said “For me this is the knighthood of sailing.″ 

In 2012 Holt was made a Deputy Lieutenant of Hampshire.

References

External links
 geoffholt.com

1966 births
Living people
Deputy Lieutenants of Hampshire
English people with disabilities
English non-fiction outdoors writers
English male sailors (sport)
Maritime writers
Members of the Order of the British Empire
Sportspeople from Portsmouth
People with tetraplegia